The Tuira River is located in the Darién Province of eastern Panama. It flows into the Bay of San Miguel at the province capital of La Palma.

It is the largest river in Panama, and one of its tributaries, the Chucunaque River, is the longest river in Panama.

The river starts in highlands of Darien, and runs south/southeast, and then north and west.  It runs past villages as it flows downstream including Matuganti, Sobiaquirú, El Balsal, Boca de Cupe, Capetí, Yape, Aruza, Unión Chocó, Vista Alegre, and Pinogana.(30 April 2008). Panama: Weary repatriation, Relief Web  It meets the Chucunaque River at El Real de Santa María and then flows northwest towards La Palma.Tuira River, Brittanica.com, Retrieved 30 November 2022  Via the Chucunaque, one can reach Yaviza, which is the terminus of the northern end of the Pan-American Highway.  

The Paya River joins the river downstream of Sobiaquirú, via which the village of Paya can be reached.   The Púcuro River joins downstream of the Paya, via which the village of Púcuro can be reached.

References 

Rivers of Panama
Landforms of Darién Province